The Liberal Party of Kosovo is a liberal political party in the Republic of Kosovo.

The party is an observer member of the Liberal International and a member of the Alliance of Liberals and Democrats for Europe Party.

In the 2004 parliamentary election, the party won 0.5% of the popular vote and 1 out of 190 seats in the Assembly of Kosovo. However, in the 2007 parliamentary election, it failed to pass the election threshold of 5%, thus becoming a non-parliamentary party. Like all other Kosovo Albanian political parties, the party supports Kosovo independence and does not take part in the general elections in Serbia nor any other election or referendum organised by the Serbian parliament. The current president of the Liberal Party of Kosovo is Gjergj Dedaj.

See also
Liberalism
Contributions to liberal theory
Liberalism worldwide
List of liberal parties
Liberal democracy

References

External links
Liberal Party of Kosovo The official website

Alliance of Liberals and Democrats for Europe Party member parties
Liberal parties in Kosovo
Political parties with year of establishment missing